Ranchordas Pagi (Born: Ranchhod Rabari) (1901–2013) worked as a scout on behalf of the Indian Army. His story is featured in a 2021 film Bhuj: The Pride of India where his character of an Indian Army Scout and R&AW agent is played by Sanjay Dutt.

Early life 
Pagi was born in a family of Pathapur Gathras or Pithapur village in Pakistan, a village bordering near Banaskantha district of Gujarat. He migrated to India after Partition of India in 1947.

A border post of Suigam in Banaskantha district of Gujarat, at the international border region of North Gujarat was named 'Ranchhoddas Post'. This was the first time that an army post was named after a common man as well as a statue of his was installed.

Pagi 
Pagi means 'guide', the person who shows the way in the desert. Ranchoddas, the man in the picture, was affectionately called 'Pagi' by General Sam Manekshaw.

Career 
Ranchoddas Pagi's life changed when, at the age of 58, he was appointed the police guide by the Banaskantha Superintendent of Police, Vanraj Singh Jhala.

He was recruited by the Indian Army. The Pakistani army captured many villages in the Kutch area just before the Indo-Pakistani War of 1965. Pagi went into the captured areas to gather information from both villagers and his own relatives. This greatly assisted the Indian army. In one of his most remarkable achievements, Ranchod Pagi traced the location of 1200 enemy soldiers hiding in the wilderness in utter darkness. He also helped the Indian army capture several key posts during the 1965 and 1971 wars with Pakistan. His efforts during the wars of 1965 and 1971 are said to have saved thousands of Indian soldiers.

Manekshaw In His Last Times Kept Remembering This Old Man Called 'Pagi'. In 2008, Field Marshal Sam Manekshaw was admitted to Wellington Hospital, Tamil Nadu. He often kept taking a name 'Pagi-Pagi' during the days of his ill-health and semi-conscious state. The doctors asked one day, "Sir, who is this Paagi?"

This story is based on what Field Marshal Sam Bahadur himself narrated. In 1971, India had won the war. General Manekshaw was in Dhaka and ordered that Pagi be invited for dinner that day. A chopper was sent. While boarding the chopper, a bag belonging to Pagi remained left on the ground and the chopper was turned back to pick it up. The officers opened the bag before placing it in the helicopter as per the rules and were stunned because it had two rotis, onions and a dish of gram flour (gathiya). One half of the meal was eaten by Sam Manekshaw and the other by Pagi for dinner.

The guide's skill was such that after seeing the footprints of the camel, he used to tell how many men are riding on it. By looking at the footprints of humans, he used to guess their weight, their age and how far they must have gone. His estimations had the exactness of a computer analyst.

In the beginning of 1965 war, Pakistan Army captured 'Vidhkot' in Kutch border in Gujarat. In this encounter, about 100 Indian soldiers were killed. A 10,000 men Indian Army contingent was mobilised and had to reach ‘Chharkot’ in three days. The need for Ranchoddas Pagi was felt for the first time by the army. Ranchordas Pagi took work as a scout on behalf of the Indian Army.

Due to his grip on the desert paths, he guided the army to the destination 12 hours before the scheduled time. He was personally chosen by Sam Saheb to guide the army and a special post was created in the army, 'Pagi' i.e., the person with knowledge of feet.

The location and approximate number of 1200 Pakistani soldiers hiding in the Indian border was revealed based only by their footprints, and that was enough for the Indian Army to win that front.

It is said that he also helped during war at Harami nala at a Channel of Sir Creek which is a Heaven for infiltrators and Smugglers.

Along with the guidance of the army in the 1971 war, getting ammunition to the front was also part of Pagi's work. Pagi's role was important in the victory of the Indian tricolor on the 'Palinagar' town of Pakistan. Sam Sahib himself gave a cash prize of ₹300 from his own pocket.

Field Marshal Sam Manekshaw died on 27 June 2008, and in 2009 at the age of 108 years, Pagi also took 'voluntary retirement' from the army. Pagi died in 2013 at the age of 112.

Even today his exploits are a part of Gujarati folk songs. His gallant saga will be sung for ages. Ranchoddas Rabari i.e., our ‘Pagi’ has become immortalized forever in Indian military history due to his patriotism, valor, bravery, sacrifice, dedication and decency.

Honours 
India's Border Security Force (BSF) has named a border outpost after Ranchhod Pagi. He had been honoured by both the police and the BSF. He received several awards including Sangram Medal, Police Medal and Samar Seva Star – for his role in the 1965 and 1971 wars. In 2007, He was congratulated by current Prime Minister of India and the then chief minister Narendra Modi, Chief Minister of Gujarat in the Independence Day celebration held at Palanpur.

References

External links
 Meet Ranchhod ‘Pagi’ The ‘Unsung Hero’ Of Indian Army For Whom Sam Manekshaw Created Special Post

1901 births
2013 deaths
Indian Army personnel
Indian centenarians
People from Banaskantha district